Huré is a French surname. Notable people with the surname include:

Anne Huré (born 1918; date of death unknown), French writer
Antoine Huré (1873–1949), French general
Benoît Huré (born 1953), French politician
Francis Huré (born 1916), French diplomat and writer
Jean Huré (1877–1930), French organist and composer
Marguerite Huré (1895–1967), French stained glass artist

See also
Augusta Hure (1870–1953), French museum curator

French-language surnames